Tragic Mulatto was an American rock band based in San Francisco, California, United States. Performing under pseudonyms, the band's nucleus consisted of vocalist Flatula Lee Roth (Gail Coulson) and bass guitarist Reverend Elvister Shanksley aka Lance Boyle (Alistair Shanks). The band released their albums on Jello Biafra's label Alternative Tentacles, with Dead Kennedys' bassist Klaus Flouride acting as producing several of their early albums.

Tragic Mulatto's music has been called "Butthole Surfers-esque", their label describing them as "[t]he dark and seedy underbelly of the average big city underbelly. A twilight zone for the already poorly adjusted." Coulson has also received praise for her vocal contributions, with her powerful delivery earning comparisons to Janis Joplin and Grace Slick.

History
Tragic Mulatto formed in 1982, initially consisting of Gail Coulson on saxophone, Alistair Shanks on bass guitar, Karl Konnerth on trumpet, Daved Marsh on vocals and Patrick Marsh on drums. The quintet recorded two records for Alternative Tentacles, an eponymously titled 7" single in 1983 and the EP Judo for the Blind in 1984. Konnerth and the Marsh brothers left the band afterward to pursue other interests.

Coulson and Boyle became the core creative force behind the group and took the stage names Flatula Lee Roth and Reverend Elvister Shanksley respectively. The duo recruited guitarist Tim Carroll of The Dicks (Richard Skidmark) and recorded the album Locos por el Sexo in 1986. Representing a change in musical direction for the band, the album emphasized melody and "enough structural backbone to give the songs non-satirical legitimacy". Spin described them as sounding "like a throbbing punkoid cross between Frightwig, real early Jefferson Airplane, and a fertile war pig from Planet 9".

The band changed guitarists and expanded their line-up to include dual percussionists Bambi Nonymous and Humpty Doody (Marc Galipeau) for their second album titled Hot Man Pussy. The album included a cover of "Whole Lotta Love" by Led Zeppelin and exhibited further musical maturity by the band. Their final release, Chartreuse Toulouse, incorporated psychedelic and Middle Eastern influences. Tragic Mulatto disbanded in 1990 after they had released their third album, with its members pursuing separate projects.

Live performances
The band was infamous for their deliberately perverse live performances, which sometimes consisted of its members performing lewd acts onstage. This lewd imagery exploited the perverse and racist mentality white society had towards mixed-race people, particularly women. Lead vocalist Coulson was known to perform mostly naked, while adorning her breasts with duct tape, polyethylene food wrap and fried eggs, and clothespins. Boyle occasionally performed naked or used a Pink Panther puppet to cover his genitals.

Discography

Studio albums
Locos por el Sexo (1987, Alternative Tentacles)
Hot Man Pussy (1989, Alternative Tentacles)
Chartreuse Toulouse (1990, Alternative Tentacles)

Singles
Tragic Mulatto (1983, Alternative Tentacles)
EPs
Judo for the Blind (1984, Alternative Tentacles)
Compilations
Italians Fall Down and Look Up Your Dress (1989, Alternative Tentacles)

References

External links
 https://alternativetentacles.com/artists/tragic-mulatto/

Musical groups disestablished in 1990
Musical groups established in 1980
Alternative Tentacles artists
American noise rock music groups
American post-hardcore musical groups
Punk rock groups from California
Musical groups from San Francisco
1980 establishments in California
1990 disestablishments in California